, AM is a Japanese scientist, a former NASDA astronaut, and a veteran of two NASA Space Shuttle missions. He is the first Japanese astronaut who was part of an official Japanese space program. The first Japanese person in space, Toyohiro Akiyama, was a journalist who was trained in the Soviet Union.

Biography

Born in Yoichi, Hokkaidō, Japan, Mohri earned both a BSc and MSc degree in chemistry from Hokkaido University in respectively 1970 and 1972, and a PhD degree in chemistry from Flinders University in Adelaide, South Australia, in 1976.

Most of Mohri's work has been in the field of materials and vacuum sciences. From 1975 to 1985, Mohri was a member of the nuclear engineering faculty of Hokkaido University, where he worked on nuclear fusion-related projects.

Mohri was selected by the National Space Development Agency of Japan (now JAXA) to train as a payload specialist for a Japanese materials science payload. He flew his first space mission aboard STS-47 in 1992 as chief payload specialist for Spacelab-J. Mohri subsequently made another trip into space as part of mission STS-99 in 2000.

As of 2001, Mohri is the Chief Executive Director Emeritus for the Miraikan, the National Museum of Emerging Science and Innovation in Tokyo.

Honours
On 16 March 2006 Mohri was appointed an Honorary Member of the Order of Australia (AM), “for service to Australia-Japan education and science relations.”

Gallery

External links 
 
 Spacefacts biography of Mamoru Mohri

References

1948 births
Living people
Flinders University alumni
Hokkaido University alumni
Japanese astronauts
People from Yoichi, Hokkaido
Honorary Members of the Order of Australia
Academic staff of Hokkaido University
Academic staff of Tokyo Institute of Technology
Space Shuttle program astronauts